"The Wrysons" is a short story by John Cheever published by The New Yorker on September 15, 1958. The work was included in the collection volume Some People, Places, and Things That Will Not Appear in My Next Novel (1961) published by Harper and Brothers. The story also appears in The Stories of John Cheever (1978).

Plot
Donald and Irene Wryson are a married couple living in the upper-middle class suburb of Shady Hill. They have one child, a girl named Dolly.

The couple have no literary or artistic interests, and pursue gardening more for appearance than pleasure. They devote most their time and energy petitioning for zoning laws to maintain the social and ethnic exclusivity of their largely WASP community. Though they rarely socialize, the couple avidly prepare and send hundreds of Christmas cards to local acquaintances.

Both Donald and Irene each have a secret eccentricity:

Irene Wryson suffers from excruciating nightmares about a dystopian world in the aftermath of a nuclear holocaust. She does not tell Donald about these recurring dreams, which include explicit scenes of carnage and death.
Set in Shady Hill, one of the dreams concerns a phantasmagoric mercy killing, in which Irene attempts to administer poison to Dolly as radioactive fallout descends on their house. 
Donald's oddness manifests itself in his baking of cakes and cookies, a skill he learned as a boy from his mother, a grass widow. He finds that the activity provides a brief antidote to his depression. These furtive nighttime activities go undetected by Irene.

One night, Irene awakes from her night terrors and detects a sweet, burning odor. Disoriented by her dream, she is convinced she smells the smoke plume from an atomic bomb. She goes downstairs and discovers Donald asleep at the kitchen table, smoke pouring from the oven. He has neglected to remove his Lady Baltimore cake before it was burnt. Irene tells Donald she thought it was a hydrogen bomb that had exploded. He informs her it is merely a cake.

Their secrets exposed, neither of them have an epiphany concerning the other's suffering. The Wrysons suppress these discoveries in the interest of preserving the normalcy of their suburban existence.

Style and theme
Literary critic Lynne Waldeland writes:

Waldeland observes that the story "ends quickly and effectively with the couple exactly the same as they were at the beginning."

Literary critic Samuel Coales comments on the characters as social types:

Donald and Irene Wrysons "suburban fear of change" is conveyed by Cheever's stylistic handling of the story. A tone of mockery is evident, but the "calm and graceful prose" balances this impression. The graphic descriptions of violence and despair in Irene's dreams "seems to be sacrificed to the beautiful calm that the style itself creates."

Coale offers this caveat:

Footnotes

Sources 
Bailey, Blake. 2009. Notes on Text in John Cheever: Collected Stories and Other Writing. The Library of America. Pp. 1025-1028 
Coale, Samuel. 1977. John Cheever. Frederick Ungar Publishing Company, New York. 
O'Hara, James E. 1989. John Cheever: A Study of the Short Fiction. Twayne Publishers, Boston Massachusetts. Twayne Studies in Short Fiction no 9. 
Waldeland, Lynne. 1979. John Cheever. Twayne Publishers, G. K. Hall & Company, Boston, Massachusetts. 

1958 short stories
American short stories
Short stories by John Cheever
Works originally published in The New Yorker